Herzog Park is a park located in Rathgar, Dublin.

History 
Dublin Corporation acquired the site in 1954 on a long term lease. However, the modern park was set out in 1985 by the Parks Department and was then known as Orwell Quarry Park.

The park was renamed in 1995 in honour of Chaim Herzog, President of Israel, who grew up in Dublin. The renaming of the park also coincided with the tri-millennium of Jerusalem.

Sports facilities 
Herzog Park is home to Rathgar Tennis Club and has 10 all weather floodlit tennis courts, a tennis wall and a clubhouse.

References 

Parks in Dublin (city)